Joseph James Purtill, Sr. (1927 – March 25, 2014) was an American jurist, lawyer and legislator.

Born in Westerly, Rhode Island, he served in the United States Navy and United States Marine Corps. Purtill received his bachelor's degree from Saint Michael's College in Vermont and his law degree from the University of Connecticut School of Law. Purtill was admitted to the Connecticut bar and practiced law. He served as the Stonington, Connecticut Town Clerk and then served in the Connecticut House of Representatives in 1959 and 1961 as a Democrat. In 1979, he was appointed to the Connecticut Superior Court.

Notes

1927 births
2014 deaths
People from Stonington, Connecticut
People from Westerly, Rhode Island
Saint Michael's College alumni
University of Connecticut School of Law alumni
Connecticut state court judges
Democratic Party members of the Connecticut House of Representatives
20th-century American judges